Heat shock 70 kDa protein 4L is a protein that in humans is encoded by the HSPA4L gene.

References

Further reading

External links 
 

Heat shock proteins